Lake Cargelligo Airport  is located at Lake Cargelligo, New South Wales, Australia.

See also
List of airports in New South Wales

References

Airports in New South Wales